FC Metallurg Kadamjay is a Kyrgyzstani football (soccer) club from Kadamjai. They have won one national championship, in 1996.

Achievements 
Kyrgyzstan League: 1
Winner: 1996

Kyrgyzstan Cup: 1
Finalist: 1996

Performance in AFC competitions
 Asian Club Championship: 1 appearance
1998: First Round

Football clubs in Kyrgyzstan